The 2010–11 New Orleans Hornets season was the 9th season of the franchise in the National Basketball Association (NBA).

The 2011 Playoffs was the final time the New Orleans Hornets made the playoffs before changing the team's mascot to "Pelicans" in 2013. The Hornets fell to the back-to-back reigning champions the Los Angeles Lakers in six first-round games. The Lakers would go on to be swept by the Dallas Mavericks in four Western Conference Semifinal games. The Mavericks would on go to be NBA Champions that year, a franchise first and their second time making the finals.

After 6 years, this season marked the end of the Chris Paul era as he was traded to the Los Angeles Clippers during the lockout after the season. Believed by many as the greatest Hornet/Pelican of all time, Paul was originally going to be traded to the Lakers in a 3-team deal that would send Lamar Odom, Goran Dragic, Luis Scola, Kevin Martin, and a 2012 first round draft pick to the Hornets and Pau Gasol to the Houston Rockets, but NBA Commissioner David Stern had controversially vetoed the trade.

Key dates
June 7 – The Hornets hired Portland Trail Blazers assistant coach Monty Williams to head coach.
June 24 – The 2010 NBA draft was held in New York City.
July 1 – The free agency period begun.
July 13 – The Hornets and GM Jeff Bower mutually parted ways.
July 22 – The Hornets hired San Antonio Spurs Vice President of Basketball Operations Dell Demps to GM.
August 11 – The Hornets hired Washington Wizards Player Personnel Director Tim Connelly to Assistant GM.
August 11 – The Hornets hired Houston Rockets Director of Scouting Gerald Madkins to Vice President of Player Personnel.

Summary

Free agency

Draft picks

Roster

2010–11 Salaries

As of September 2010:

Pre-season

Game log

|- bgcolor="#ffcccc"
| 1
| October 9
| Memphis
| 
| Trevor Ariza (17)
| Emeka Okafor (9)
| Chris Paul,Marco Belinelli,David West (4)
| New Orleans Arena11,461
| 0–1
|- bgcolor="#ffcccc"
| 2
| October 10
| @ Orlando
| 
| Peja Stojaković (20)
| Emeka Okafor (8)
| Chris Paul (10)
| Amway Center18,516
| 0–2
|- bgcolor="#ccffcc"
| 3
| October 13
| Miami
| 
| Marco Belinelli (19)
| Jason Smith (8)
| Chris Paul (7)
| New Orleans Arena12,043
| 1–2
|- bgcolor="#ffcccc"
| 4
| October 15
| @ Indiana
| 
| Marco Belinelli (16)
| Jason Smith (9)
| Chris Paul (8)
| Conseco Fieldhouse10,758
| 1–3
|- bgcolor="#ffcccc"
| 5
| October 16
| Atlanta
| 
| Marco Belinelli (13)
| Pops Mensah-Bonsu (9)
| Chris Paul (4)
| Mountain States Health Alliance Athletic Center5,933
| 1–4
|- bgcolor="#ffcccc"
| 6
| October 18
| @ Memphis
| 
| Pops Mensah-Bonsu (19)
| Pops Mensah-Bonsu (10)
| Chris Paul (12)
| FedExForum8,268
| 1–5
|- bgcolor="#ffcccc"
| 7
| October 20
| @ Charlotte
| 
| Marco Belinelli (25)
| Chris Paul (6)
| Chris Paul (14)
| Time Warner Cable Arena19,077
| 1–6
|- bgcolor="#ffcccc"
| 8
| October 21
| @ Oklahoma City
| 
| David West (24)
| D. J. Mbenga,Marcus Thornton,Jason Smith (6)
| Willie Green (6)
| Oklahoma City Arena16,541
| 1–7
|-

Regular season

Standings

Game log

|- bgcolor="#ccffcc"
| 1
| October 27
| Milwaukee
| 
| David West (22)
| Emeka Okafor (9)
| Chris Paul (16)
| New Orleans Arena15,039
| 1–0
|- bgcolor="#ccffcc"
| 2
| October 29					
| Denver
| 
| Chris Paul (18)
| Emeka Okafor (8)
| Chris Paul (7)
| New Orleans Arena12,474
| 2–0
|- bgcolor="#ccffcc"
| 3
| October 30
| @ San Antonio
| 
| Chris Paul (25)
| Chris Paul,Marcus Thornton (7)
| Chris Paul (5)
| AT&T Center18,581
| 3–0
|-

|- bgcolor="#ccffcc"
| 4
| November 3
| @ Houston
| 
| Chris Paul (25)
| Emeka Okafor,David West,Jason Smith (9)
| Chris Paul (8)
| Toyota Center13,484
| 4–0
|- bgcolor="#ccffcc"
| 5
| November 5
| Miami
| 
| Emeka Okafor (26)
| Emeka Okafor (13)
| Chris Paul (19)
| New Orleans Arena17,988
| 5–0
|- bgcolor="#ccffcc"
| 6
| November 6
| @ Milwaukee
| 
| David West (25)
| Chris Paul (9)
| Chris Paul (6)
| Bradley Center16,731
| 6–0
|- bgcolor="#ccffcc"
| 7
| November 9
| L.A. Clippers
| 
| Willie Green (19)
| Emeka Okafor (7)
| Jerryd Bayless (9)
| New Orleans Arena12,479
| 7–0
|- bgcolor="#ccffcc"
| 8
| November 13
| Portland
| 
| Marco Belinelli,David West (18)
| Emeka Okafor (12)
| Chris Paul (13)
| New Orleans Arena14,706
| 8–0
|- bgcolor="#ffcccc"
| 9
| November 15
| @ Dallas
| 
| Chris Paul (22)
| Emeka Okafor (14)
| Chris Paul (9)
| American Airlines Center19,712
| 8–1
|- bgcolor="#ccffcc"
| 10
| November 17
| Dallas
| 
| Chris Paul (20)
| Emeka Okafor (10)
| Chris Paul (11)
| New Orleans Arena13,828
| 9–1
|- bgcolor="#ccffcc"
| 11
| November 19
| Cleveland
| 
| David West (34)
| David West (11)
| Chris Paul (10)
| New Orleans Arena14,755
| 10–1
|- bgcolor="#ccffcc"
| 12
| November 21
| @ Sacramento
| 
| David West (17)
| Emeka Okafor (12)
| Chris Paul (14)
| ARCO Arena12,003
| 11–1
|- bgcolor="#ffcccc"
| 13
| November 22
| @ L.A. Clippers
| 
| David West (30)
| Emeka Okafor (12)
| Chris Paul (6)
| Staples Center17,787
| 11–2
|- bgcolor="#ffcccc"
| 14
| November 24
| @ Utah
| 
| Chris Paul (17)
| Emeka Okafor (10)
| Chris Paul (9)
| EnergySolutions Arena19,237
| 11–3
|- bgcolor="#ccffcc"
| 15
| November 26
| @ Portland
| 
| Willie Green (19)
| Emeka Okafor (9)
| Chris Paul (13)
| Rose Garden20,452
| 12–3
|- bgcolor="#ffcccc"
| 16
| November 28
| San Antonio
| 
| David West (23)
| Emeka Okafor,David West (7)
| Chris Paul (7)
| New Orleans Arena12,449
| 12–4
|- bgcolor="#ffcccc"
| 17
| November 29
| @ Oklahoma City
| 
| David West (20)
| Emeka Okafor (11)
| Chris Paul (14)
| Oklahoma City Arena18,203
| 12–5
|-

|- bgcolor="#ccffcc"
| 18
| December 1
| Charlotte
| 
| David West (22)
| Emeka Okafor (13)
| Chris Paul (14)
| New Orleans Arena10,866
| 13–5
|- bgcolor="#ffcccc"
| 19
| December 3
| New York
| 
| Trevor Ariza (21)
| Emeka Okafor (14)
| Chris Paul (10)
| New Orleans Arena14,020
| 13–6
|- bgcolor="#ffcccc"
| 20
| December 5
| @ San Antonio
| 
| Chris Paul (16)
| Chris Paul,Jason Smith,David West (5)
| Chris Paul (8)
| AT&T Center17,571
| 13–7
|- bgcolor="#ccffcc"
| 21
| December 8
| Detroit
| 
| David West (25)
| Trevor Ariza,Jason Smith (7)
| Chris Paul (14)
| New Orleans Arena10,823
| 14–7
|- bgcolor="#ffcccc"
| 22
| December 10
| Oklahoma City
| 
| David West (24)
| David West (13)
| Chris Paul (7)
| New Orleans Arena14,428
| 14–8
|- bgcolor="#ffcccc"
| 23
| December 12
| @ Philadelphia
| 
| Chris Paul (25)
| Trevor Ariza (10)
| Chris Paul (3)
| Wells Fargo Center13,884
| 14–9
|- bgcolor="#ffcccc"
| 24
| December 13
| @ Miami
| 
| David West (26)
| David West (12)
| Chris Paul (5)
| American Airlines Arena19,600
| 14–10
|- bgcolor="#ccffcc"
| 25
| December 15
| Sacramento
| 
| Chris Paul (22)
| Emeka Okafor,David West (9)
| Chris Paul (11)
| New Orleans Arena13,325
| 15–10
|- bgcolor="#ccffcc"
| 26
| December 17
| Utah
| 
| David West (23)
| Emeka Okafor (11)
| Chris Paul (10)
| New Orleans Arena14,414
| 16–10
|- bgcolor="#ffcccc"
| 27
| December 19
| @ Detroit
| 
| David West (32)
| Emeka Okafor (12)
| Chris Paul (10)
| The Palace of Auburn Hills16,452
| 16–11
|- bgcolor="#ffcccc"
| 28
| December 20
| @ Indiana
| 
| Emeka Okafor (19)
| Emeka Okafor (15)
| Jarrett Jack (6)
| Conseco Fieldhouse12,271
| 16–12
|- bgcolor="#ccffcc"
| 29
| December 22
| New Jersey
| 
| Emeka Okafor (21)
| Emeka Okafor (10)
| Chris Paul (14)
| New Orleans Arena15,423
| 17–12
|- bgcolor="#ccffcc"
| 30
| December 26
| Atlanta
| 
| Chris Paul (22)
| Emeka Okafor (15)
| Chris Paul (8)
| New Orleans Arena15,626
| 18–12
|- bgcolor="#ffcccc"
| 31
| December 27
| @ Minnesota
| 
| David West (23)
| Emeka Okafor (8)
| Chris Paul (13)
| Target Center11,679
| 18–13
|- bgcolor="ffcccc"
| 32
| December 29
| L.A. Lakers
| 
| Chris Paul (20)
| Emeka Okafor (7)
| Chris Paul (7)
| New Orleans Arena18,018
| 18–14
|- bgcolor="#ccffcc"
| 33
| December 31
| @ Boston
| 
| Chris Paul (20)
| Emeka Okafor (13)
| Chris Paul (11)
| TD Garden18,624
| 19–14
|-

|- bgcolor="#ccffcc"
| 34
| January 1
| @ Washington
| 
| Trevor Ariza (22)
| Emeka Okafor (15)
| Chris Paul (11)
| Verizon Center16,026
| 20–14
|- bgcolor="#ccffcc"
| 35
| January 3
| Philadelphia
| 
| David West (17)
| Emeka Okafor,David West (8)
| Chris Paul (5)
| New Orleans Arena13,433
| 21–14
|- bgcolor="#ffcccc"
| 36
| January 5
| Golden State
| 
| Chris Paul (24)
| Trevor Ariza,Emeka Okafor (10)
| Chris Paul (13)
| New Orleans Arena13,532
| 21–15
|- bgcolor="#ffcccc"
| 37
| January 7
| @ L.A. Lakers
| 
| David West (23)
| Emeka Okafor (13)
| Chris Paul (10)
| Staples Center18,997
| 21–16
|- bgcolor="#ccffcc"
| 38
| January 9
| @ Denver
| 
| Chris Paul (20)
| Emeka Okafor (13)
| Chris Paul (6)
| Pepsi Center16,283
| 22–16
|- bgcolor="#ccffcc"
| 39
| January 12
| Orlando
| 
| Marcus Thornton (22)
| Emeka Okafor (14)
| Chris Paul (13)
| New Orleans Arena13,688
| 23–16
|- bgcolor="#ccffcc"
| 40
| January 14
| @ Houston
| 
| David West (29)
| Emeka Okafor (15)
| Chris Paul (8)
| Toyota Center13,616
| 24–16
|- bgcolor="#ccffcc"
| 41
| January 15
| @ Charlotte
| 
| David West (26)
| Emeka Okafor (10)
| Trevor Ariza,Chris Paul (4)
| Time Warner Cable Arena17,486
| 25–16
|- bgcolor="#ccffcc"
| 42
| January 17
| Toronto
| 
| David West (23)
| Emeka Okafor (16)
| Chris Paul (11)
| New Orleans Arena15,155
| 26–16
|- bgcolor="#ccffcc"
| 43
| January 19
| Memphis
| 
| Chris Paul (20)
| Emeka Okafor,David West (11)
| Chris Paul (12)
| New Orleans Arena15,951
| 27–16
|- bgcolor="#ccffcc"
| 44
| January 21
| @ Atlanta
| 
| Chris Paul (16)
| Emeka Okafor (12)
| Chris Paul (8)
| Philips Arena14,875
| 28–16
|- bgcolor="#ccffcc"
| 45
| January 22
| San Antonio
| 
| Marcus Thornton,David West (18)
| Emeka Okafor (12)
| Chris Paul (6)
| New Orleans Arena18,023
| 29–16
|- bgcolor="#ccffcc"
| 46
| January 24
| Oklahoma City
| 
| Chris Paul (24)
| Emeka Okafor (9)
| Chris Paul (9)
| New Orleans Arena17,233
| 30–16
|- bgcolor="#ccffcc"
| 47
| January 26
| @ Golden State
| 
| David West (22)
| Trevor Ariza,Emeka Okafor (7)
| Chris Paul (17)
| Oracle Arena18,108
| 31–16
|- bgcolor="#ffcccc"
| 48
| January 29
| @ Sacramento
| 
| David West (21)
| David West (7)
| Chris Paul (7)
| ARCO Arena14,534
| 31–17
|- bgcolor="#ffcccc"
| 49
| January 30
| @ Phoenix
| 
| Chris Paul (26)
| Marcus Thornton (10)
| Chris Paul (12)
| US Airways Center17,921
| 31–18
|-

|- bgcolor="#ccffcc"
| 50
| February 1
| Washington
| 
| Jason Smith (20)
| Aaron Gray,David West (8)
| Chris Paul (9)
| New Orleans Arena13,921
| 32–18
|- bgcolor="#ffcccc"
| 51
| February 2
| @ Oklahoma City
| 
| David West (20)
| David West (15)
| Chris Paul (5)
| Oklahoma City Arena17,849
| 32–19
|- bgcolor="#ffcccc"
| 52
| February 5
| L.A. Lakers
| 
| Chris Paul (21)
| David West (12)
| Chris Paul (15)
| New Orleans Arena18,426
| 32–20
|- bgcolor="#ffcccc"
| 53
| February 7
| Minnesota
| 
| David West (18)
| Aaron Gray (8)
| Chris Paul (13)
| New Orleans Arena13,401
| 32–21
|- bgcolor="#ffcccc"
| 54
| February 9
| @ New Jersey
| 
| David West (32)
| David West (15)
| Chris Paul (11)
| Prudential Center13,316
| 32–22
|- bgcolor="#ccffcc"
| 55
| February 11
| @ Orlando
| 
| Willie Green (24)
| David West (17)
| Chris Paul (7)
| Amway Center18,944
| 33–22
|- bgcolor="#ffcccc"
| 56
| February 12
| Chicago
| 
| Marcus Thornton (24)
| Aaron Gray,Marcus Thornton (6)
| Chris Paul (6)
| New Orleans Arena17,831
| 33–23
|- bgcolor="#ffcccc"
| 57
| February 15
| @ Golden State
| 
| Marco Belinelli,David West (15)
| David West (7)
| Chris Paul (10)
| Oracle Arena18,276
| 33–24
|- bgcolor="#ffcccc"
| 58
| February 16
| @ Portland
| 
| David West (27)
| Trevor Ariza (9)
| Trevor Ariza (6)
| Rose Garden20,650
| 33–25
|- align="center"
|colspan="9" bgcolor="#bbcaff"|All-Star Break 
|- bgcolor="#ccffcc"
| 59
| February 23
| L.A. Clippers
| 
| David West (22)
| David West (8)
| Chris Paul (10)
| New Orleans Arena17,537
| 34–25
|- bgcolor="#ccffcc"
| 60
| February 25
| @ Minnesota
| 
| Trevor Ariza (18)
| Emeka Okafor (7)
| Chris Paul (8)
| Target Center16,965
| 35–25
|- bgcolor="#ffcccc"
| 61
| February 27
| Houston
| 
| David West (22)
| Emeka Okafor (14)
| Chris Paul (12)
| New Orleans Arena17,466
| 35–26
|-

|- bgcolor="#ffcccc"
| 62
| March 1
| @ Toronto
| 
| David West (19)
| David West (10)
| Chris Paul (5)
| Air Canada Centre14,704
| 35–27
|- bgcolor="#ffcccc"
| 63
| March 2
| @ New York
| 
| Jarrett Jack (21)
| Emeka Okafor (8)
| Chris Paul (10)
| Madison Square Garden19,763
| 35–28
|- bgcolor="#ccffcc"
| 64
| March 4
| @ Memphis
| 
| Chris Paul (23)
| Carl Landry (10)
| Chris Paul (14)
| FedExForum15,367
| 36–28
|- bgcolor="#ccffcc"
| 65
| March 6
| @ Cleveland
| 
| David West (23)
| Emeka Okafor,David West (7)
| Chris Paul (11)
| Quicken Loans Arena18,754
| 37–28
|- bgcolor="#ffcccc"
| 66
| March 7
| @ Chicago
| 
| Jarrett Jack (23)
| David West (11)
| Jarrett Jack,David West (3)
| United Center21,997
| 37–29
|- bgcolor="#ccffcc"
| 67
| March 9
| Dallas
| 
| Marco Belinelli,Jarrett Jack (21)
| David West (10)
| Jarrett Jack (7)
| New Orleans Arena14,472
| 38–29
|- bgcolor="#ccffcc"
| 68
| March 12
| Sacramento
| 
| Chris Paul (33)
| David West (9)
| Chris Paul (15)
| New Orleans Arena15,530
| 39–29
|- bgcolor="#ffcccc"
| 69
| March 14
| Denver
| 
| Chris Paul (27)
| Emeka Okafor (7)
| Chris Paul (10)
| New Orleans Arena11,782
| 39–30
|- bgcolor="#ccffcc"
| 70
| March 16
| Phoenix
| 
| Chris Paul (26)
| Emeka Okafor (11)
| Chris Paul (9)
| New Orleans Arena13,758
| 40–30
|- bgcolor="#ffcccc"
| 71
| March 19
| Boston
| 
| David West (32)
| Emeka Okafor (11)
| Chris Paul (15)
| New Orleans Arena18,018
| 40–31
|- bgcolor="#ccffcc"
| 72
| March 24
| @ Utah
| 
| David West (29)
| Trevor Ariza (9)
| Chris Paul (12)
| EnergySolutions Arena18,840
| 41–31
|- bgcolor="#ccffcc"
| 73
| March 25
| @ Phoenix
| 
| Chris Paul (22)
| Emeka Okafor (12)
| Chris Paul (7)
| US Airways Center18,422
| 42–31
|- bgcolor="#ffcccc"
| 74
| March 27
| @ L.A. Lakers
| 
| Carl Landry (24)
| Emeka Okafor (11)
| Chris Paul (9)
| Staples Center18,997
| 42–32
|- bgcolor="#ccffcc"
| 75
| March 30
| Portland
| 
| Carl Landry (21)
| Emeka Okafor (10)
| Chris Paul (12)
| New Orleans Arena12,575
| 43–32
|-

|- bgcolor="#ffcccc"
| 76
| April 1
| Memphis
| 
| Carl Landry (19)
| Emeka Okafor (10)
| Chris Paul (13)
| New Orleans Arena16,561
| 43–33
|- bgcolor="#ccffcc"
| 77
| April 3
| Indiana
| 
| Trevor Ariza (19)
| Emeka Okafor (17)
| Chris Paul (8)
| New Orleans Arena13,898
| 44–33
|- bgcolor="#ccffcc"
| 78
| April 6
| Houston
| 
| Chris Paul (28)
| Carl Landry,Chris Paul (9)
| Chris Paul (10)
| New Orleans Arena12,728
| 45–33
|- bgcolor="#ccffcc"
| 79
| April 8
| Phoenix
| 
| Willie Green (31)
| Trevor Ariza (8)
| Chris Paul (12)
| New Orleans Arena14,950
| 46–33
|- bgcolor="#ffcccc"
| 80
| April 10
| @ Memphis
| 
| Marco Belinelli (18)
| Emeka Okafor (7)
| Chris Paul (10)
| FedExForum17,041
| 46–34
|- bgcolor="#ffcccc"
| 81
| April 11
| Utah
| 
| Chris Paul (15)
| Aaron Gray (9)
| Jarrett Jack (6)
| New Orleans Arena12,558
| 46–35
|- bgcolor="#ffcccc"
| 82
| April 13
| @ Dallas
| 
| Jarrett Jack (21)
| Aaron Gray (10)
| Chris Paul (8)
| American Airlines Center20,366
| 46–36
|-

Playoffs

Game log

|- bgcolor=ccffcc
| 1
| April 17
| @ L.A. Lakers
| 
| Chris Paul (33)
| Trevor Ariza,Chris Paul (7)
| Chris Paul (14)
| Staples Center18,997
| 1–0
|- bgcolor=ffcccc
| 2
| April 20
| @ L.A. Lakers
| 
| Trevor Ariza (22)
| Aaron Gray (8)
| Chris Paul (9)
| Staples Center18,997
| 1–1
|- bgcolor=ffcccc
| 3
| April 22
| L.A. Lakers
| 
| Carl Landry (23)
| Trevor Ariza (12)
| Chris Paul (8)
| New Orleans Arena18,340
| 1–2
|- bgcolor=ccffcc
| 4
| April 24
| L.A. Lakers
| 
| Chris Paul (27)
| Chris Paul (13)
| Chris Paul (15)
| New Orleans Arena18,083
| 2–2
|- bgcolor=ffcccc
| 5
| April 26
| @ L.A. Lakers
| 
| Trevor Ariza (22)
| Aaron Gray (6)
| Chris Paul (12)
| Staples Center18,997
| 2–3
|- bgcolor=ffcccc
| 6
| April 28
| L.A. Lakers
| 
| Carl Landry (19)
| Chris Paul (8)
| Chris Paul (11)
| New Orleans Arena17,949
| 2–4
|-

Player statistics

Regular season 

|-
| 
| 29 || 0 || 7.7 || .446 || .385 || .467 || 1.7 || .2 || .1 || .2 || 2.7 
|-
| 
| 75 || 75 || 34.7 || .398 || .303 || .701 || 5.4 || 2.2 || 1.6 || .4 || 11.0 
|-
| 
| 11 || 0 || 13.5 || .347 || .214 || .765 || 1.4 || 2.5 || .2 || .1 || 4.5
|-
| 
| style="background:#FDB827;color:#FFFFFF;" | 80 || 69 || 24.5 || .437 || .414 || .784 || 1.9 || 1.2 || .5 || .1 || 10.5
|-
| 
| 7 || 0 || 2.7 || .000 || .000 || .750 || .3 || .3 || .0 || .1 || .4
|-
| 
| 41 || 6 || 13.0 || .566 || . || .500 || 4.2 || .4 || .3 || .3 || 3.1
|-
| 
| 77 || 13 || 21.7 || .443 || .348 || .780 || 2.1 || 1.0 || .5 || .2 || 8.7
|-
| 
| 41 || 0 || 8.0 || .469 || . || .722 || 2.1 || .1 || .1 || .7 || 1.4
|-
| 
| 70 || 2 || 19.6 || .412 || .345 || .845 || 1.9 || 2.6 || .6 || .1 || 8.5
|-
| 
| 23 || 10 || 26.2 || .527 || .000 || .795 || 4.1 || .6 || .4 || .5 || 11.8
|-
| 
| 7 || 0 || 5.0 || .333 || . || . || 1.6 || .3 || .0 || .0 || .3
|-
| 
| 72 || 72 || 31.8 || style="background:#FDB827;color:#FFFFFF;" | .573 || .000 || .562 || style="background:#FDB827;color:#FFFFFF;" | 9.5 || .6 || .6 || style="background:#FDB827;color:#FFFFFF;" | 1.8 || 10.3
|-
| 
| style="background:#FDB827;color:#FFFFFF;" | 80 || style="background:#FDB827;color:#FFFFFF;" | 80 || style="background:#FDB827;color:#FFFFFF;" | 36.0 || .463 || .388 || style="background:#FDB827;color:#FFFFFF;" | .878 || 4.1 || style="background:#FDB827;color:#FFFFFF;" | 9.8 || style="background:#FDB827;color:#FFFFFF;" | 2.4 || .1 || 15.8
|-
| 
| 4 || 1 || 12.5 || .182 || .000 || . || 1.5 || 1.5 || .0 || 1.0 || 1.0
|-
| 
| 66 || 6 || 11.1 || .406 || .360 || .706 || 1.3 || .4 || .3 || .2 || 2.8
|-
| 
| 77 || 6 || 14.3 || .443 || .000 || .843 || 3.1 || .5 || .3 || .4 || 4.3
|-
| 
| 6 || 0 || 14.8 || .424 || style="background:#FDB827;color:#FFFFFF;" | .440 || .857 || 1.0 || 1.0 || .3 || .0 || 7.5
|-
| 
| 46 || 0 || 16.2 || .410 || .376 || .758 || 2.8 || .9 || .4 || .1 || 7.8
|-
| 
| 70 || 70 || 35.0 || .508 || .222 || .807 || 7.6 || 2.3 || 1.0 || .9 || style="background:#FDB827;color:#FFFFFF;" | 18.9
|}

Playoffs

|-
| 
| style="background:#FDB827;color:#FFFFFF;" | 6 || style="background:#FDB827;color:#FFFFFF;" | 6 || 40.2 || .412 || .333 || .727 || 6.5 || 3.3 || 1.3 || .5 || 15.5 
|-
| 
| style="background:#FDB827;color:#FFFFFF;" | 6 || style="background:#FDB827;color:#FFFFFF;" | 6 || 28.8 || .365 || .308 || style="background:#FDB827;color:#FFFFFF;" | 1.000 || .8 || .7 || .8 || .0 || 9.7
|-
| 
| 2 || 0 || 1.0 || style="background:#FDB827;color:#FFFFFF;" | 1.000 || style="background:#FDB827;color:#FFFFFF;" | 1.000 || . || .0 || .0 || .0 || .0 || 1.5
|-
| 
| style="background:#FDB827;color:#FFFFFF;" | 6 || 0 || 14.5 || .692 || . || .375 || 3.5 || .3 || .3 || .3 || 3.5
|-
| 
| style="background:#FDB827;color:#FFFFFF;" | 6 || 0 || 14.0 || .389 || .222 || .571 || .8 || .7 || .3 || .0 || 5.7
|-
| 
| 5 || 0 || 5.2 || style="background:#FDB827;color:#FFFFFF;" | 1.000 || . || .500 || 1.0 || .2 || .4 || .6 || 1.0
|-
| 
| style="background:#FDB827;color:#FFFFFF;" | 6 || 0 || 18.5 || .353 || .000 || .688 || 2.5 || 2.2 || .2 || .2 || 5.8
|-
| 
| style="background:#FDB827;color:#FFFFFF;" | 6 || style="background:#FDB827;color:#FFFFFF;" | 6 || 35.5 || .456 || . || .917 || 5.0 || 1.0 || .7 || .5 || 15.8
|-
| 
| style="background:#FDB827;color:#FFFFFF;" | 6 || style="background:#FDB827;color:#FFFFFF;" | 6 || 31.3 || .645 || . || .364 || 5.5 || .0 || 1.0 || style="background:#FDB827;color:#FFFFFF;" | 1.0 || 7.3
|-
| 
| style="background:#FDB827;color:#FFFFFF;" | 6 || style="background:#FDB827;color:#FFFFFF;" | 6 || style="background:#FDB827;color:#FFFFFF;" | 41.7 || .545 || .474 || .796 || style="background:#FDB827;color:#FFFFFF;" | 6.7 || style="background:#FDB827;color:#FFFFFF;" | 11.5 || style="background:#FDB827;color:#FFFFFF;" | 1.8 || .0 || style="background:#FDB827;color:#FFFFFF;" | 22.0
|-
| 
| 3 || 0 || 3.0 || .167 || .000 || . || .3 || .3 || .0 || .0 || .7
|-
| 
| style="background:#FDB827;color:#FFFFFF;" | 6 || 0 || 9.7 || .467 || . || . || 1.2 || .2 || .3 || .0 || 2.3
|}

Awards, records and milestones

Awards

Week/Month

All-Star
Chris Paul was selected as a starter to his 4th NBA All Star game

Season

Records

Milestones

Injuries and surgeries

Transactions

Trades

Free agents

Additions

Subtractions

|}

References

New Orleans Hornets seasons
New Orleans